The 2008–09 season is PAOK FC's 50th consecutive season in the Super League Greece.

Players

Squad 

Last updated: 31 January 2013 
Source: Squad at PAOK FC official website

Transfers

In

Total spending:  €1.20M

Out

 Total Income: €5.1M

Net income:  €3.9M 
Last updated: 31 January 2013

Kit

|
|
|

Competitions

Overview

Super League Greece

League table

According to the official Super League playoff regulation, the position after the playoffs replaces the regular season position.

Results summary

Results by round

Matches

Play-offs

Matches

Greek Football Cup

Fourth round

Fifth round

Quarterfinals

Statistics

Squad statistics

! colspan="13" style="background:#DCDCDC; text-align:center" | Goalkeepers
|-

! colspan="13" style="background:#DCDCDC; text-align:center" | Defenders
|-

! colspan="13" style="background:#DCDCDC; text-align:center" | Midfielders
|-

! colspan="13" style="background:#DCDCDC; text-align:center" | Forwards
|-

|}

Goalscorers

Disciplinary record

Only competitive matches 
 = Number of bookings;  = Number of sending offs after a second yellow card;  = Number of sending offs by a direct red card.
0 shown as blank

Source: Match reports in competitive matches, superleaguegreece.net

References

2008-09
PAOK F.C. season